The 1925 Irish local elections were the first local elections following the establishment of the Irish Free State. The Local Government Act 1925 had abolished rural district councils, passing their powers to Ireland's various county councils.

Background
Elections did not place in all councils, with a number of councils being dissolved by W. T. Cosgraves Cumann na nGaedheal government in 1923 and 1924, either due to being controlled by anti-Treaty politicians during the Irish Civil War, or because of alleged financial mismanagement. These councils instead were run by appointed commissioners.

Dissolved councils included:

 Cork Corporation
 Dublin Corporation
 Leitrim County Council
 Kerry County Council
 Offaly County Council
 Cobh Urban District Council
 Tipperary Urban District Council
 Dublin District Guardians
 Roscommon Town Commissioners

Detailed results

County Councils

Borough Councils

References

 
Ireland
1925 in Ireland
1925 in Irish politics
June 1925 events
Local